Senator Aldridge may refer to:

Cliff Aldridge (born 1962), Oklahoma State Senate
Vic Aldridge (1893–1973), Indiana State Senate

See also
Senator Aldrich (disambiguation)